The 2008 German Athletics Championships were held at the easyCredit-Stadion in Nuremberg on 5–6 July 2008.

Results

Men

Women

References 
 Results source: 

2008
German Athletics Championships
German Athletics Championships